The Stirlingshire Cup is an association football cup competition for clubs in the county of Stirlingshire, Scotland. The competition was founded in 1883 and is contested annually by senior member clubs of the Stirlingshire Football Association. The current champions are Stenhousemuir F.C. who defeated East Stirlingshire in the 2014–15 tournament final.

Format
The competition is a knock-out tournament contested by the six member clubs of the Stirlingshire Football Association. In the first round draw, two teams receive byes into the semi-final with the remaining four clubs paired against each other. The winners of the two first round matches progress to the semi-final and the losers are eliminated from the tournament.

Participating teams (2014–15)
 Alloa Athletic
 Dumbarton
 East Stirlingshire
 Falkirk
 Stenhousemuir
 Stirling Albion

History
The Stirlingshire Cup tournament commenced in the 1883–84 football season as a competition for member clubs of the newly created Stirlingshire Football Association which was founded on 25 December 1883. The original meeting to form the organisation was held in Larbert and was attended by representatives from seven football clubs: Campsie, Dunipace, East Stirlingshire, Falkirk, King's Park, Stenhousemuir and Tayavalla. The first tournament began in January 1884 and was contested by the seven original attendees of the meeting as well as seven other clubs from Stirlingshire: Comely Park, Grahamston, Grasshoppers, Milngavie, Ochil Rangers, Strathblane and Vale of Bannock. The inaugural tournament was won by Falkirk who defeated East Stirlingshire 3–1 in a final replay after an initial 1–1 draw.

Performance by club 
Final appearances

References 

Football cup competitions in Scotland
Football in Stirling (council area)
Football in Falkirk (council area)